Iebe Swers (born 27 December 1996) is a Belgian footballer who plays for Mechelen.

Club career
On 28 May 2021, he signed a four-year contract with Mechelen.

References

1996 births
Sportspeople from Hasselt
Footballers from Limburg (Belgium)
Living people
Belgian footballers
Belgium youth international footballers
Association football wingers
Sint-Truidense V.V. players
Lommel S.K. players
R.F.C. Seraing (1922) players
K.V. Mechelen players
Belgian Pro League players
Challenger Pro League players
21st-century Belgian people